The 1985 Country Music Association Awards, 19th Ceremony, was held on October 14, 1985, at the Grand Ole Opry House, Nashville, Tennessee, and was hosted by CMA Award winners Kris Kristofferson and Anne Murray.

Winners and nominees 
Winner are in Bold.

Hall of Fame

References 

Country Music Association
CMA
Country Music Association Awards
Country Music Association Awards
Country Music Association Awards
Country Music Association Awards
20th century in Nashville, Tennessee
Events in Nashville, Tennessee